Piplantri a village located in Rajsamand district in Rajasthan State, India.

Notability
The villagers of Piplantri plant 111 trees every time a girl child is born and the community ensures these trees survive, attaining fruition as the girls grow up. India has a huge deficit of girls because society is obsessed with the male child and girls are considered financial burdens because of the dowry practices. Over the years, people here have managed to plant over 300,000 trees on the village's grazing commons - including Neem, Sheesham, Mango, Amla among others.

To ensure financial security, after the birth of a girl child, the villagers contribute Rs 21,000 collectively and take Rs 10,000 from the parents and put it in a fixed deposit bank account, which can be used only after she turns 18. To make sure that the girl child receives a proper education, the villagers make the parents sign an affidavit (legal contract) which 

Shyam Sunder Paliwal, the former sarpanch (elected village head) started this initiative in memory of his daughter Kiran, who died a few years ago.

The initiative that began in 2006 has turned Piplantri village into an oasis. The birth of a girl child is now welcomed and the village is covered with Neem, Mango, Amla and Sheesham trees leading to a higher water level and richer wildlife.

The initiative has also helped the town’s economy. To keep termites away from the trees, many of which bear fruit, the village has planted more than 2.5 million Aloe vera plants around them. Gradually, the villagers realized that Aloe vera could be processed and marketed in a variety of ways. So the community now produces and markets aloe-based products like juice and gel, among other things.

References

Villages in Rajsamand district
Environment and society
Save the Children
Ecofeminism
Eco-socialism